Cahun is a surname. Notable people with the surname include:

Carl Pontus Gahn (Cahun) (1759–1825)  Swedish military officer
Claude Cahun (1894–1954), French artist, photographer and writer
David Léon Cahun (1841–1900),  Jewish French traveler, Orientalist and writer
Joshua Ljubiša Cahun (2001-Present),  English/Serbian Stokie

Kohenitic surnames
French-language surnames